"Saul Gone" is the series finale of Better Call Saul, the spin-off television series of Breaking Bad. It is the thirteenth and final episode of the sixth season and the series' 63rd episode overall. Written and directed by Peter Gould, who co-created the series with Vince Gilligan, the episode aired on AMC and AMC+ on August 15, 2022, before debuting online in certain territories on Netflix the following day.

"Saul Gone" is primarily set in late 2010, with flashbacks set during Breaking Bad and Better Call Saul. It depicts Jimmy McGill (Bob Odenkirk) facing the consequences of the conflicts caused by his three identities: his actions throughout Better Call Saul under his birth name, the federal crimes he committed for Walter White (Bryan Cranston) throughout Breaking Bad as Saul Goodman, and the schemes he ran in Omaha, Nebraska, as Gene Takavic. The episode also sees Jimmy and Kim Wexler (Rhea Seehorn) meeting for the first time in six years.

Gould and the Better Call Saul writing staff knew the series would end with Jimmy going to prison for his actions in Breaking Bad by the time the fifth-season finale aired in 2020. They sought to differentiate "Saul Gone" from Breaking Bad "Felina" (2013) and El Camino: A Breaking Bad Movie (2019) by making it slower and more dialogue focused. Several actors from Better Call Saul and Breaking Bad returned for guest appearances, including Cranston as Walt, Betsy Brandt as Marie Schrader, and Michael McKean as Chuck McGill.

An estimated 1.80 million viewers saw the episode during its first broadcast on AMC. "Saul Gone" received acclaim, with critics praising Jimmy's character development and his reconciliation with Kim. Many considered it a "masterful" conclusion to the series. Gilligan has stated that "Saul Gone" is likely the last entry in the Breaking Bad franchise, as he and Gould have no plans for further works continuing it.

Plot 
In flashbacks, Jimmy McGill / Saul Goodman converses with Mike Ehrmantraut, Walter White, and Chuck McGill. He asks Mike and Walt what they would do if they could travel back in time. Mike says he would stop himself from taking his first bribe, while Walt says he would have stayed at Gray Matter Technologies. Jimmy tells Mike he would have invested in Berkshire Hathaway and tells Walt he regrets injuring his knee during a scam. Mike and Walt each chastise Jimmy for his greed and inherent criminal traits. In another flashback, Chuck suggests that Jimmy consider a career other than law, but Jimmy counters that Chuck never did. Chuck offers to consult with Jimmy about his new legal clients, but Jimmy brushes him off. As Jimmy leaves, Chuck picks up a copy of The Time Machine by H. G. Wells.

In 2010, Jimmy, as Gene Takavic, is apprehended by Omaha police and hires Bill Oakley to defend him. With Jimmy facing a life sentence plus 190 years for helping Walt develop his methamphetamine empire, Bill negotiates a plea bargain that includes a 30-year sentence. Marie Schrader objects and accuses Jimmy of complicity in the murders of Hank Schrader and Steven Gomez. Jimmy convinces the lead Assistant U.S. Attorney that he could deadlock a jury by portraying himself as Walt's victim, resulting in a plea bargain that reduces his prison time to seven and a half years. Jimmy attempts to further reduce his sentence by offering information about Howard Hamlin's death, unaware that Kim Wexler had already done so. Jimmy learns that Howard's widow Cheryl may file a civil lawsuit against Kim. In a U.S. Marshal's presence, he tells Bill he will testify against Kim.

In Florida, Kim starts volunteering at a pro bono legal services firm. District Attorney Suzanne Ericsen calls her to warn that Jimmy's testimony could affect her. Kim attends the sentencing in Albuquerque, where Jimmy admits he lied so she would be present in person. He confesses to enabling Walt and admits his role in Chuck's suicide. He is sentenced to 86 years in prison, where he is revered by fellow inmates who recognize him as Saul. Kim visits him and they share a cigarette. As she departs, he goes to the prison yard to see her off and gestures finger guns. Kim acknowledges the gesture and leaves.

Production

Development 
"Saul Gone" is the series finale for Better Call Saul, and was written and directed by series co-creator and showrunner Peter Gould. Gould wrote the Breaking Bad episode "Better Call Saul", which introduced the character Saul Goodman, and co-created the spin-off with Vince Gilligan. Gould and Gilligan initially served as co-showrunners before Gilligan left the writers room to focus on other projects, resulting in Gould becoming the sole showrunner.

In the week leading up to the finale, Gilligan stated that the episode would likely be the last entry in the Breaking Bad franchise, as he and Gould were both ready to move on to new stories. Gould later acknowledged that by the time Breaking Bad ended, he and Gilligan were already developing the spin-off, but by the time Better Call Sauls finale aired, the two were working on other projects.

Casting 

Bob Odenkirk, Jonathan Banks, and Rhea Seehorn are the only cast members listed in the starring credits. Gould considered the finale a mix of the world of Better Call Saul and Breaking Bad characters, as the episode featured several returning actors from both series. This included Banks as Mike Ehrmantraut and guest stars Bryan Cranston as Walter White, Michael McKean as Chuck McGill, and Betsy Brandt as Marie Schrader. The episode also marked the first appearance of Steven Gomez's wife Blanca, portrayed by Marisilda Garcia, who was referenced multiple times but unseen in Breaking Bad. Gould wanted to bring back other Better Call Saul actors, such as Patrick Fabian, Giancarlo Esposito, and Michael Mando, as well as others that appeared on Breaking Bad, including Anna Gunn, RJ Mitte, and Dean Norris. However, wanting to avoid an "overstuffed epic", he and the writing staff were unable to incorporate them into the finale.

Banks, Cranston and McKean's characters appeared in flashbacks, whereas Brandt's character appeared in the present timeline. Gould compared the scenes with Mike, Walter and Chuck to the three ghosts of A Christmas Carol, each showing Saul repeating the same cycle in his life. He also felt Chuck's cameo brought the show back to its beginning. McKean filmed his scene before traveling to the United Kingdom for another project, Cranston's appearance was filmed months before principal photography for the finale occurred to accommodate his schedule, while Brandt spent a relatively longer time in Albuquerque due to having more scenes to film than the other guest stars.

Writing 
The title of "Saul Gone" is a play on the words "s'all gone" and Saul Goodman's name, itself a play on the phrase "it's all good, man". The episode, season, and series ends with Gene Takavic getting caught by the authorities and, under his legal name of Saul Goodman, getting sentenced to prison for the crimes he committed in Breaking Bad. Gould and the writing staff knew by the time the fifth season finale aired two years prior that this was the right ending for the series. They realized that Saul spent his career making a mockery of the justice system, so it was fitting to them that he ended the series as a part of it, only this time as a prisoner. Gould further elaborated that in the finale, Saul had gone from someone who ran the courtroom to becoming the subject of one.

Gould and the writing staff felt strongly to end Better Call Saul differently than Breaking Bad and its sequel film El Camino: A Breaking Bad Movie (2019). Comparing the fates of the three works' main protagonists, Gould explained that Walter White achieved his ambitions but ended up dead, Jesse Pinkman suffered greatly but found freedom, while Saul Goodman chose long-term incarceration but regained his soul. Saul's fate at the end of "Saul Gone" was nearly assigned to Jesse, as Gilligan had toyed with the idea of ending El Camino with Jesse residing in a jail cell, imprisoned yet at peace. However, when Gilligan pitched this idea to Better Call Saul writing staff years prior, they advised against it on the grounds that Jesse had suffered too much to be incarcerated, while Gould also felt this was a more appropriate ending for Saul. When comparing the finale of Breaking Bad to the finale of Better Call Saul, Gould said he felt that Walter dealt death to people, so his series ended "in a blaze of glory"; in contrast, Gould believed Saul was a man of words, and that his ending needed to be more dialogue-focused. Odenkirk described the ending as being "more psychological and quieter and slower. It's deeply about character".

However, Gould considered Better Call Sauls ending an optimistic one, not just for Saul Goodman, but for Kim Wexler as well. With the two characters finally confessing their misdeeds, Gould felt both chose to end their cycles of self-destructive tendencies and would refrain from making the same mistakes again. He further acknowledged the challenging circumstances that awaited the two characters, with Saul spending his life in prison and Kim potentially facing a civil lawsuit, but Gould believed that in cleaning their conscience, both regained a part of their humanity and could begin living more honest lives.

The writers room discussed the idea of having the prison room scene be the last shot of the series. However, Gould did not want the show to end with Saul and Kim together in the same frame, feeling it more honest to finish with the two of them apart. He instead chose to end the series with the two parting in the prison yard to deal with the likely truth that Saul will be incarcerated for the rest of his life. Gould also said that whether Kim would return to visit Saul again was up to the audience to decide.

Filming 
When filming the opening scene in the desert, Gould mentioned the location's cold weather conditions strongly contrasted with the blazing heat that occurred when shooting the episode "Bagman", which took place in the same setting. The very first two shots of the rocks and Jimmy's car in the desert came from unused footage from previous episodes. For the courtroom scene, production staff initially struggled to find a location, but were eventually granted permission by the New Mexico Supreme Court to film on the top floor of their building. The location was only available on weekends, resulting in the entire crew shifting their working week to Wednesday through Sunday. Filming lasted three days on the scene; Odenkirk mentioned asking to reshoot the scene after initially completing it. To help film Chuck's flashback scene, production designer Denise Pizzini had to rebuild the set for Chuck's house on stage, as it was previously destroyed during the fourth season.

Saul and Kim sharing a cigarette while leaning against a prison room wall was the last scene filmed during principal photography for the series. Gould considered the moment, which itself was an homage to the first episode, as the two characters relating to one another without speaking. Odenkirk detailed the scene as being a "big deal for us, and it felt incredibly organic and natural, the feelings of acceptance and love at a level they've never shared before", furthermore describing the two characters as "bigger people than they had shown themselves to be, and that scene grants them that intelligence as well as the bravery to do that – to own their shortcomings". While the scene was filmed in black-and-white, as with all other parts of the Gene timeline, a brief use of color on the cigarette and lighter flame was included. Gould said this use of color was a sign of Gene recalling his fondness for his relationship with Kim. The scene's music was reused from the first episode, which was Dave Porter's first composition for Better Call Saul.

During the final scene in the prison yard, many viewers noticed Kim's right hand subtly gesturing a gun in response to Saul shooting finger guns at her. Odenkirk and Seehorn said an alternate take was filmed of Kim returning Saul's gesture by fully shooting finger guns back at him, but Gould felt that this could be interpreted as Kim going back to her old ways. As a result, the scene that made it to air used the take of Kim merely looking at Saul instead. Seehorn described the overall scene as being "about the acknowledgement of their bond that is still there, and the part of their relationship that was true".

Themes and motifs 
The Time Machine, which Jimmy picks up at Chuck's house, is visible in the prologue opening of "Wine and Roses", when authorities remove Saul Goodman's possessions from his mansion after he flees Albuquerque. In the next episode, "Carrot and Stick", it is visible on Jimmy's bedroom nightstand at Kim's apartment. Its placement is intended to illustrate the regrets several characters feel over their actions, including Jimmy, Kim, Walt, and Mike. In Jimmy's case, The Time Machine and his questions about time travel reveal his biggest regret was the way his relationship with Chuck ended, which he did not resolve until his courtroom confession. Showrunner Peter Gould suggested that Chuck having a copy of The Time Machine in the flashback scene implied that he too was experiencing regrets around this period.

When Jimmy asks Walt about his greatest regret in the flashback showing their time in Ed Galbraith's hideout, Walt briefly glances at the wristwatch that Jesse gave him in the Breaking Bad episode "Fifty-One" (2012). Rae Torres of Collider felt this indicated that Walt's greatest regret was not leaving Gray Matter Technologies but rather his abusive treatment of Jesse throughout Breaking Bad, and served to contrast with Jimmy's inability to honestly answer his own question.

Reception

Critical response 
"Saul Gone" received universal acclaim from critics. On the review aggregator Rotten Tomatoes, the episode received an approval rating of 100% based on 30 reviews, with an average rating of 10/10. The critical consensus reads, "The lawyer who broke bad finally comes clean in 'Saul Gone,' an emotionally powerful and thematically fitting conclusion to one of television's great dramas." The episode was considered by critics to be a "masterful" conclusion to the series, and TVLine ranked it as one of the best series finales of all time. Many critics highlighted Jimmy's character development, his redemption, and reconciliation with Kim, in addition to the motif of time machines in the episode.

Giving the episode an A grade, Kimberly Potts of The A.V. Club called it a "supremely satisfying sendoff" with "blasts from the past and one last twist". At IGN, Rafael Motamayor gave the episode a 10 out of 10 rating, describing it as a "subtler character study, exploring regrets and change in its protagonist". He also noted the episode title and complimented it for being "a thematic bookend on a show that was never really about Saul Goodman" and highlighted the motif of time machines. Similarly, Vulture's Jen Chaney also discussed the motif of time machines in the episode, and commended it for offering more depth and context to Breaking Bad, and felt the series was superior to Breaking Bad, as it "dared to widen its scope and go bigger than Breaking Bad ever did". Meanwhile, David Segal of The New York Times felt Saul's discussions with Mike, Walter, and Chuck about time machines helped "riff on the theme of regret and second chances". In addition, the website's Scott Tobias gave it a 5 out of 5 rating and wrote, "'Saul Gone' [...] finds an ending for Jimmy that's hopeful and authentic without feeling rosy or unearned."

Miles Surrey of The Ringer discussed the scene in which Jimmy testifies before court, and highlighted the inner conflict between his Jimmy McGill and Saul Goodman personae, ultimately feeling Jimmy won, as he had realized "the prospect of reconciling with [Kim] takes him on a new path—one toward redemption". He praised Jimmy's characterization in the episode, and felt that the series "showed that it's never too late to stop breaking bad for the ones you love". At Variety, Daniel D'Addario highlighted Odenkirk's performance in the court scene, and felt the episode was "meticulous" and commended Gould's writing and narrative structure. He felt that the episode was superior to Breaking Bad's series finale, "Felina". James Osborne of The A.V. Club commended the return of Betsy Brandt as Marie Schrader, saying that despite audiences sympathizing with Jimmy over the course of Better Call Sauls six seasons, Marie's appearance served as a reminder of how his actions on Breaking Bad directly affected her and as to why he was in the courtroom in the first place.

Ratings 
An estimated 1.80 million viewers watched "Saul Gone" during its first broadcast on AMC on August 15, 2022. This made the finale the series' most-watched episode since third season finale "Lantern", which aired five years prior. Including delayed viewing totals gave the final tally a total of 2.7 million viewers on AMC. 

Upon the episode's initial release on AMC+, the network's streaming platform, the app experienced an outage, causing many users to be logged out. AMC later reported that first-day viewing numbers for the finale on AMC+ was four times as big as the season premiere, and called the final season of Better Call Saul the highest acquisition driver in the history of the streaming service.

Notes

References

External links 
 "Saul Gone" at AMC
 

2022 American television episodes
American television series finales
Black-and-white television episodes
Better Call Saul (season 6) episodes